Sir Esmond Ovey  (23 July 1879 – 30 May 1963) was a British diplomat who was ambassador to the Soviet Union, Belgium and Argentina.

Career
Esmond Ovey was educated at Eton College and entered the Diplomatic Service as an attaché in 1902. He was appointed to Tangier but did not go there that year, instead being sent to Stockholm to assist with extra work in the period preceding the Russo-Japanese War. He did go to Tangier in 1904, was promoted to Third Secretary in 1905 and posted to Paris in 1906. While at the Paris embassy he was decorated with the MVO when King Edward VII visited Biarritz in 1907. In 1908 he was posted to Washington, D.C. where he met, and in May 1909 married, Blanche, daughter of Rear-Admiral William H. Emory, United States Navy. In the same month he was promoted to Second Secretary.

In 1912 Ovey was transferred to Sofia and in 1913 to Constantinople. When the Ottoman Empire came into the First World War the British Ambassador, Sir Louis Mallet, left Constantinople with all his staff except Ovey, who was seriously ill with typhoid fever. "Luckily he was able to be moved to the American Embassy but Wangenheim, the German Ambassador, endeavoured to obtain Ovey's removal before he was sufficiently recovered. It was lucky that his wife was an American." Ovey was transferred to Norway where he remained for the rest of the war, acting as chargé d'affaires when the Minister was absent. He was promoted to First Secretary in 1916.

In 1920 he was promoted to Counsellor and appointed to Tehran, but did not proceed; instead, he worked at the Foreign Office until 1924 when he did go briefly to Tehran before being posted to Rome, also briefly, before he was appointed Minister to Mexico when diplomatic relations were resumed in 1925 (having been broken off in 1914).

In August 1929 Ovey was appointed Minister to Brazil, but he did not proceed there and instead was appointed, in November of that year, to be the first British
Ambassador to the Soviet Union. The United Kingdom had recognised the Soviet Union in 1924, and Sir Robert Hodgson had been posted there as chargé d'affaires, but the British diplomatic mission had been withdrawn in 1927. Simultaneously a Soviet ambassador to the U.K. was appointed; Grigori Sokolnikov arrived in London on the same day as Ovey arrived in Moscow, 13 December 1929.

Relations between the U.K. and the Soviet Union were uneasy and Ovey had to deal with several controversies. On the lighter side, however, Ovey related that when he was invited to a banquet by Soviet Foreign Commissar Maxim Litvinov, he observed that his fork – and all the knives, forks and spoons on the table – bore the British coat of arms, having been stolen during the Russian Revolution from the then British Embassy. Ovey made no protest.

However, a serious crisis arose in March 1933 when six engineers of Metropolitan-Vickers were arrested in Moscow and tried for espionage and "wrecking" because some turbines built by the company were faulty. Ovey had a stormy interview with Litvinov in which he "observed a strong but correct attitude. His efforts were, on the whole, successful." One of the men was acquitted, three deported and two imprisoned but released after two months. Meanwhile, Ovey had been recalled to London to report and never returned to Russia.

Ovey was appointed ambassador to Belgium in April 1934 and transferred to be ambassador to Argentina (and minister to Paraguay), his final appointment, in 1937. He retired in 1942.

Honours
Esmond Ovey was appointed MVO in 1907, CMG in 1917, knighted KCMG in the King's Birthday Honours of 1929 and raised to GCMG in the Birthday Honours of 1941.

The King of Belgium gave him the Grand Cross of the Order of Leopold.

Personal life
In May 1909, in Washington, Esmond Ovey married Blanche, daughter of Rear-Admiral William H. Emory, United States Navy. She died in 1924. In 1930, in Paris, he married Marie-Armande, daughter of René Vignat, of Paris, and widow of Señor Barrios, of Mexico. She died in 1954.

In 1933, Sir Esmond and Lady Ovey took a long lease of Culham Manor, near Abingdon, Oxfordshire. They restored the house over several years and lived there until his death in 1963.

Offices held

References and sources
References

Sources
OVEY, Sir Esmond, Who Was Who, A & C Black, 1920–2008; online edn, Oxford University Press, Dec 2007, retrieved 4 September 2012
Obituary – Sir Esmond Ovey – A Wide Diplomatic Career (with photo), The Times, London, 31 May 1963, page 16

External links
 Morrell, Gordon, Britain Confronts the Stalin Revolution: Anglo-Soviet Relations and the Metro-Vickers Crisis, Wilfrid Laurier University Press, 1995
 Sir Esmond Ovey (photograph), National Portrait Gallery, London

1879 births
1963 deaths
People educated at Eton College
Ambassadors of the United Kingdom to Mexico
Ambassadors of the United Kingdom to the Soviet Union
Ambassadors of the United Kingdom to Belgium
Ambassadors of the United Kingdom to Argentina
Ambassadors of the United Kingdom to Paraguay
Knights Grand Cross of the Order of St Michael and St George
Members of the Royal Victorian Order